Arsen Karen Harutyunyan (born 22 November 1999 in Masis) is an Armenian freestyle wrestler.

In 2018, Harutyunyan won his first senior national championship in Armenia and was the representative at 61 kg at the 2019 European Wrestling Championships held in Bucharest, Romania. Harutyunyan defeated Georgian wrestler Beka Lomtadze in the finals by a score of 17–11, and captured his first senior European Championship gold, as well as his first international medal at senior level.

He represented Armenia at the 2020 Summer Olympics held in Tokyo, Japan. He competed in the men's 57 kg event..European champion in 2022 in the weight category up to 61 kg, bronze medalist of the World Championships in 2021 and 2022 in the weight category up to 61 kg, world champion in 2021 and 2022 under 23 in the weight category up to 61 kg. The wrestler represents Armenia, but also competes in the German Bundesliga.

Career 
Arsen Harutyunyan was born on November 22, 1999 in Masis. It was there that he began to take his first steps in wrestling, under the guidance of coach Artur Martoyan. Currently, he trains at the Yerevan State Sports College of the Olympic Reserve under the guidance of personal trainer Arshak Hayrapetyan.
In August 2018, at the European Youth Championship held in Rome, Arsen Harutyunyan, in the weight category up to 57 kg, in the final with a score of 11:6, defeated Ukrainian Andriy Jelep.
After that, he signed a contract with the Ispringen club, which presents the German Bundesliga and soon made his debut in the adult tournament, too. Arsen's Bundesliga debut was a success. He won victories there in his first 4 fights, including over famous athletes.
In September of the same year, in the Slovak city of Trnava, where the World Youth Freestyle Wrestling Championship was held, Arsen Harutyunyan, in the weight category up to 57 kg, in a duel for the bronze medal, defeated South Korean Hyonsu Cho with a score of 16:4.
In December 2018, Arsen became the champion of Armenia, showing that he has serious chances to become one of the leaders in the Armenia national team. In 2019, he became the European champion in the weight category up to 61 kg.
In February 2020, at the Continental Championships in the Italian capital, in the weight category up to 61 kg, Arsen overcame an athlete from Greece Georgios Pilidis in a fight for the bronze medal and won the bronze medal of the European championship.
In 2021, at the World Championships, which took place in October in the Oslo, he became a bronze medalist in the weight category up to 61 kg. In the semifinals, he lost to American wrestler Daton Fix.  Arsen Harutyunyan is the eldest of five children in the family. His younger brother is also engaged in freestyle wrestling, being a member of the Armenia youth national team.
Arsen was elected one of the 10 best athletes of Armenia in 2021 by the results of a vote of sports journalists and head coaches of national teams.

Achievements 
Champion of the 2015 Armenian Youth Championship in the weight category up to 46 kg
Champion of the 2015 European Youth Championship in the weight category up to 46 kg 
Champion of the 2016 Armenian Youth Championship in the weight category up to 54 kg
Silver medalist of the 2016 European Youth Championship in the weight category up to 54 kg
Champion of the 2017 Armenian Youth Championship in the weight category up to 55 kg
Bronze medalist of the 2017 European Youth Championship in the weight category up to 55 kg
Bronze medalist of the 2017 Junior World Championship in the weight category up to 55 kg
Champion of the 2018 Armenian Youth Championship in the weight category up to 57 kg
Champion of the 2018 European Youth Championship in the weight category up to 57 kg 
Bronze medalist of the 2018 World Youth Championship in the weight category up to 57 kg
Champion of Armenia in 2018 in the weight category up to 61 kg
Winner of the 2019 European Championship in the weight category up to 61 kg
Silver medalist of the 2020 Individual World Cup in the weight category up to 57 kg 
Champion of Armenia in 2020 in the weight category up to 57 kg
Bronze medalist of the European Championship 2020 in the weight category up to 61 kg
Bronze medalist of the 2021 World Championship in the weight category up to 61 kg
Winner of the Olympic Qualification Tournament for Men's 2021  in the weight category up to 57 kg
Winner of the U23 World Championship in 2021 in the weight category up to 61 kg
Winner of the U23 World Championship in 2022 in the weight category up to 61 kg
Bronze medalist of the 2022 World Championship men's in the weight category up to 61kg 
Gold medalist of the 2022 European Wrestling Championships Men's Freestyle in the weight category up to 61kg kg

Education 
In 2018-2021 he studied and graduated from the Coaching and Pedagogical Faculty of the Armenian State Institute of Physical Culture and Sport with a red diploma. In 2021-2023, he studied and graduated from the gymnastics department of the Armenian State Institute of Physical Culture and Sport with a red diploma and received a master's degree.

Personal life 
In October 2022 Arsen Harutyunyan married Diana Adibekyan.

External links
 
Top Competitors At U23 Worlds - Men's Freestyle
Arsen Harutyunyan - Olympic Results Tokyo 2020

Armenian freestyle wrestler Arsen Harutyunyan (57 kg) will compete on August 4
Armenia's Arsen Harutyunyan wrestles Mongolia's Bekhbayar Erdenebat in their men's freestyle 57kg wrestling early round match during the Tokyo 2020 Olympic Games
Ravinder suffered a 0-10 loss to Arsen Harutyunyan of Armenia in the bronze medal bout of the men’s 61kg freestyle category
Member of the Armenian freestyle wrestling team, European champion Arsen Harutyunyan gave a press conference
International Wrestling Database - Harutyunyan, Arsen (ARM)
Arsen Harutyunyan։ This is our victory
Արսեն Հարությունյանը հաղթեց թուրք ըմբիշին և հռչակվեց Եվրոպայի կրկնակի չեմպիոն
Արսեն Հարությունյանը բացահայտ առավելությամբ հաղթեց թուրքին ու նվաճեց Եվրոպայի չեմպիոնի տիտղոսը
Arsen Harutyunyan (61 kg) won the bronze medal at the tournament in Alexandria

References

1999 births
Living people
Armenian male sport wrestlers
People from Masis
European Wrestling Championships medalists
Wrestlers at the 2020 Summer Olympics
European Wrestling Champions
20th-century Armenian people
21st-century Armenian people
Olympic wrestlers of Armenia